Lubandji Ochumba Oseke (born 1 July 2001) is a Zambian footballer who plays as a midfielder for the Zambia women's national team. She competed for Zambia at the 2018 Africa Women Cup of Nations, playing in one match.

References

2001 births
Living people
Zambian women's footballers
Zambia women's international footballers
Women's association football midfielders
Nkwazi F.C. players
Footballers at the 2020 Summer Olympics
Olympic footballers of Zambia